Julius Erman "Empoy" Ramos Marquez (born July 3, 1981), also known mononymously as Empoy, is a Filipino actor and comedian. He is best known for playing the male lead in Kita Kita (2017), the highest-grossing Filipino independent film of all time.

After winning the Mr. Suave look-alike contest on Magandang Tanghali Bayan, he was awarded a minor role in the 2003 comedy film Mr. Suave. From 2003 to 2008, he had small roles in several films and television shows, where he was typecast as the comical sidekick. He also appeared in some independent films.

Marquez then appeared in TV5's Lokomoko (2008–2013), Tropa Mo Ko Unli (2013–2015), and played the titular superhero character in Kapitan Awesome (2012–2013). He also portrayed Chiz in the 2015 sitcom Mac & Chiz. In 2018, he had a supporting role in the television drama Since I Found You and also co-starred in the film Kusina Kings.

Life and career
Julius Erman Ramos Marquez was born in Baliuag, Bulacan on July 3, 1981. He is the eldest among seven siblings, and his parents separated when he was in sixth grade. He earned his college degree in mass communication with the intention of becoming a DJ.

In 2003, Marquez won the Mr. Suave look-alike contest on ABS-CBN's Magandang Tanghali Bayan. Aside from the cash prize, he was also awarded a role in the film, which starred Vhong Navarro as the title character. He also became a co-host of MTB Ang Saya-Saya for a year.

Marquez was signed to Star Magic from 2003 to 2007, and moved to TV5 in 2008. During this time, he had small roles in several films and television shows where he was typecast as the comical sidekick. He also appeared in the independent films Sa Aking Pagkakagising Mula Sa Kamulatan (2005) and Carnivore (2008), both directed by Ato Bautista and starring Carlo Aquino.

In TV5, Marquez appeared in the sketch comedy show Lokomoko, which aired from 2008 to 2013 – the network's longest-running comedy show. He then played the titular superhero character in Kapitan Awesome (2012–2013), and became a cast member of Tropa Mo Ko Unli (2013–2015). He considers the 2015 sitcom Mac & Chiz as his "big break", where he co-starred as Chiz, alongside Derek Ramsay who played Mac.

In 2017, Marquez returned to ABS-CBN and became part of the sketch comedy show Banana Sundae. He also appeared in the suspense thriller film Bloody Crayons (2017) as Gerard, the "clown" of the group of friends who travel to a remote island to make a short film, until they get killed one by one by a masked individual.

Afterwards, Marquez co-starred in the romantic comedy film Kita Kita (2017), opposite to Alessandra de Rossi. He portrayed Tonyo, a plain-looking but kind-hearted OFW in Japan, who falls in love with a blind woman played by De Rossi. According to the film's co-producer Piolo Pascual, the role of Tonyo was "tailor-made" for Marquez. Against expectations, Kita Kita went on to become the highest-grossing Filipino independent film of all time, earning ₱300 million (approx. US$5.88 million) within three weeks of release. Due to the film's popularity, the entertainment media dubbed Marquez and De Rossi's pairing as "AlEmpoy".

In July 2017, Marquez opened Wayback 90's, a 1990s-themed restobar in his hometown, Baliuag, Bulacan.

In 2018, Marquez and De Rossi had supporting roles in the ABS-CBN series Since I Found You, which aired from April to August. That same year, in the comedy film Kusina Kings, Marquez and Zanjoe Marudo starred as a pair of chefs who attempt to save their restaurant by joining a reality show.

Beginning in 2019, Marquez appeared in FPJ's Ang Probinsyano as Domingo "Domengsu" Suarez, an aspiring actor who is mistakenly arrested in a drug raid and later becomes a police informant. Also in 2019, he was reunited with De Rossi in the music video for "Pag-ibig Sa Tabing-Dagat" by Orange and Lemons.

Filmography

Television

Film

References

External links
 

1981 births
Living people
Male actors from Bulacan
Filipino male television actors
Filipino male comedians
Filipino male film actors
ABS-CBN personalities
TV5 (Philippine TV network) personalities
GMA Network personalities